In complex analysis, Runge's theorem (also known as Runge's approximation theorem) is named after the German mathematician Carl Runge who first proved it in the year 1885. It states the following:

Denoting by C the set of complex numbers, let K be a compact subset of C and let f be a function which is holomorphic on an open set containing K. If A is a set containing at least one complex number from every bounded connected component of C\K then there exists a sequence  of rational functions which converges uniformly to f on K and such that all the poles of the functions  are in A.

Note that not every complex number in A needs to be a pole of every rational function of the sequence . We merely know that for all members of  that do have poles, those poles lie in A.

One aspect that makes this theorem so powerful is that one can choose the set A arbitrarily. In other words, one can choose any complex numbers from the bounded connected components of C\K and the theorem guarantees the existence of a sequence of rational functions with poles only amongst those chosen numbers.

For the special case in which C\K is a connected set (in particular when K is simply-connected), the set A in the theorem will clearly be empty. Since rational functions with no poles are simply polynomials, we get the following corollary: If K is a compact subset of C such that C\K is a connected set, and f is a holomorphic function on an open set containing  K, then there exists a sequence of polynomials  that approaches f uniformly on K (the assumptions can be relaxed, see Mergelyan's theorem).

Runge's theorem generalises as follows: one can take A to be a subset of the Riemann sphere C∪{∞} and require that A intersect also the unbounded connected component of K (which now contains ∞). That is, in the formulation given above, the rational functions may turn out to have a pole at infinity, while in the more general formulation the pole can be chosen instead anywhere in the unbounded connected component of C\K.

Proof
There is a closed piecewise-linear contour Γ in the open set, containing K in its interior. By Cauchy's integral formula

for w in K. Riemann approximating sums can be used to approximate the contour integral uniformly over K. Each term in the sum is a scalar multiple of (z − w)−1 for some point z on the contour. This gives a uniform approximation by a rational function with poles on Γ.

To modify this to an approximation with poles at specified points in each component of the complement of K, it is enough to check this for terms of the form  (z − w)−1. If z0 is the point in the same component as z, take a piecewise-linear path from z to  z0. If two points are sufficiently close on the path, any rational function with poles only at the first point can be expanded as a Laurent series about the second point. That Laurent series can be truncated to give a rational function with poles only at the second point uniformly close to the original function on K. Proceeding by steps along the path from z to z0 the original function (z − w)−1 can be successively modified to give a rational function with poles only at z0.

If z0 is the point at infinity, then by the above procedure the rational function  (z − w)−1 can first be approximated by a rational function g with poles at R > 0 where R is so large that K lies in w < R.  The Taylor series expansion of g about 0 can then be truncated to give a polynomial approximation on K.

See also
Mergelyan's theorem
Oka–Weil theorem
Behnke–Stein theorem on Stein manifolds

References

External links
 

Theorems in complex analysis